Geoff Drakeford (born 21 December 1991) is an Australian professional golfer from Yarram, Australia.

Drakeford turned professional in 2014 and has mostly played on the PGA Tour of Australasia. He had some success in 2015, finishing runner-up in the New Zealand PGA Championship, the Challenge de España and the New South Wales PGA Championship during the year.

Team appearances
Amateur
Nomura Cup (representing Australia): 2013 (winners)
Eisenhower Trophy (representing Australia): 2014
Bonallack Trophy (representing Asia/Pacific): 2014
Australian Men's Interstate Teams Matches (representing Victoria): 2011, 2012, 2013, 2014 (winners)

External links

Australian male golfers
PGA Tour of Australasia golfers
Golfers from Melbourne
1991 births
Living people